Mike Wilhelm may refer to:

 Mike Wilhelm (musician) (1942–2019), American guitarist, singer and songwriter
 Mike Wilhelm (basketball) (born 1966/67), American basketball coach